Roy F. Chandler (December 17, 1925 - December 24, 2015) was the author of more than sixty published books  and many magazine articles. He is known for his series of sniper related books, including the series "Death From Afar".

Biography
Chandler was a United States Army veteran with more than twenty years of active service including World War II and Korea. Later he was a schoolteacher in Pennsylvania and Alaska. His writing is often based on personal experience. He was a full-time author for more than thirty years. Chandler died of cancer on December 24, 2015.

Bibliography

Perry County, Pennsylvania, series 
Limited edition copies, where known.
History of Early Perry County Guns and Gunsmiths, 1969	
A History of Perry County Railroads, 1970	
Tales of Perry County, 1973	
A History of Hunting in Perry County, 1974	
Arrowmaker, 1974	
Antiques of Perry County, 1976	
The Black Rifle, 1976	
Homes, Barns and Outbuildings of Perry County, 1978	
Shatto, 1979	
The Perry County Flavor, 1980	
The Didactor, 1981 (900)
Fort Robinson: A novel of Perry County Pennsylvania, the years 1750-63, 1981 (800)
Friend Seeker: A novel of Perry County PA, 1982 (900)
Perry County in Pen & Ink, 1983	
Shatto's way: A novel of Perry County, Pa, 1984 (1000)
Chip Shatto: A novel of Perry County Pennsylvania, the years 1863-65, 1984	
Firefighters of Perry County, 1982	
Perry County Sketchbook, 1986	
The Warrior, A novel of Perry County Pennsylvania, 1995 (1500)
The Perry Countian, 1987	
Hawk's Feather - An Adventure Story, 1988	
Ted's Story, 1988 (1000)
Cronies, 1989	
Song of Blue Moccasin, 1989	
The Sweet Taste, 1990	(1000)
Tiff's Game: A work of fiction, 1991	
Old Dog, 1993	
Tim Murphy, Rifleman: A novel of Perry County, Pa, 1754-1840, 1993	
Ramsey: A novel of Perry County Pennsylvania, 1994	
Last Black Book, 1995
Ironhawk, 1999

The Gun of Joseph Smith series (young adult) 
The Gun of Joseph Smith', (with Katherine R. Chandler), 1987	Tuck Morgan, Plainsman (Vol. 2) (with Katherine R. Chandler), 1991	Morgan's Park (Vol. 3) (with Katherine R. Chandler), 1997

 Death From Afar series 			Death From Afar I (and Norman A. Chandler), 1992	Death From Afar II: Marine Corps Sniping (and Norman A. Chandler), 1993	Death From Afar Vol. III: The Black Book (and Norman A. Chandler), 1994	Death From Afar IV (and Norman A. Chandler), 1996	Death From Afar V (and Norman A. Chandler), 1998

 Other fiction Chugger's Hunt, 1990Gray's Talent, 1995Dark shadow, 1996Sniper One (Iron Brigade series), 2000	Shooter Galloway', 2004The Boss's Boy, 2007Pardners, 2008The Saga of Hawk's Revenge, 2010

 Other non-fiction 
( )Limited edition copies, where known.Alaskan hunter: a book about big game hunting, 1972Kentucky Rifle Patchboxes and Barrel Marks, 1972 (400)Arms Makers of Eastern Pennsylvania, 1981 (1000)Gunsmiths of Eastern Pennsylvania, 1982	Pennsylvania Gunmakers (a collection), 1984A 30', $6,000 Cruising Catamaran, 1987Alcatraz: The Hard Years 1934-1938, (with Erville F. Chandler), 1989Kentucky Rifle Patchboxes All New Volume 2, 1992	Behold the Long Rifle, 1993	The Kentucky Pistol, 1994 (1800)Choose the Right Gun, 1994 (2000)Hunting Alaska, 1995The Hunter's Alaska, 2005White Feather: Carlos Hathcock USMC scout sniper (and Norman A. Chandler), 1997One Shot Brotherhood (and Norman A. Chandler), 2001

 Children’s books All About a Foot Soldier, 1965	Oog The Baker, 2006

 Perry County frontier series reading order according to The Last Black Book 
 Friend Seeker The Warrior (1721-1764) Arrowmaker The Black Rifle Fort Robinson (1750–63) Ironhawk Song of Blue Moccasin Tim Murphy, Rifleman (1754-1840) Hawk's Feather Shatto Chip Shatto (1863–65) Ted's Story Tiff's Game Cronies The Didactor The Perry Countian The Sweet Taste Old Dog Ramsey Shatto's Way''

Footnotes

1925 births
American male writers
2015 deaths
Pennsylvania State University alumni